Eumitra imbricata is a species of sea snail, a marine gastropod mollusk, in the family Mitridae, the miters or miter snails.

Description
The length of the shell attains 15.6 mm.

Distribution
This species occurs in the Coral Sea.

References

imbricata
Gastropods described in 1991